Prosopine is an alkaloid found in Prosopis africana.

References 

Alkaloids
Alkaloids found in Fabaceae